Aspergillus panamensis is a species of fungus in the genus Aspergillus which produces cyclogregatin, gregatin A, gregatin B, gregatin C and gregatin D.

References

Further reading 
 
 

panamensis
Fungi described in 1944
Taxa named by Charles Thom